Venturia may refer to:
 Venturia (band), a progressive-metal band from Montpellier, France
 Venturia (comics), an outpost of Atlantis in the DC Universe 
 Venturia (fungus), a genus of fungi including Venturia inaequalis
 Venturia (wasp), a genus of ichneumon wasps
 Venturia, North Dakota, a small American city

See also
 Veturia or Volumnia, Roman matron, mother of general Gaius Marcius Coriolanus